Edward Owen may refer to:

Edward Owen (translator) (1728/29–1807), Welsh Anglican priest, headmaster and translator
Edward Owen (Royal Navy officer) (1771–1849), Commander-in-Chief, Mediterranean Fleet
Edward Maes Llaned Owen (1846–1931), Welsh engineer and pioneer in Y Wladfa
Eddie Owen (runner) (1886–1949), British middle and long distance runner
Edward Owen (rugby) (1903–?), Welsh rugby union and professional rugby league footballer
Edward Owen (artist) (died 1741), Welsh artist and minor noble
Edward Roger Owen (1935–2018), British historian
Edward Owen (Paralympian) (1946–2008), American Paralympian
Edward Pryce Owen (1788–1863),English artist

See also

Edward Owens (disambiguation)
Ted Owens (disambiguation)